Carnegie Mellon University Africa, in Kigali, Rwanda, is a global location of Carnegie Mellon University. CMU-Africa offers master's degrees in Information Technology, Electrical and Computer Engineering, and Engineering Artificial Intelligence. CMU-Africa is part of the Carnegie Mellon College of Engineering. The College of Engineering is top-ranked. In U.S. News & World Reports 2023 graduate rankings, the College of Engineering was ranked #4.

History of Carnegie Mellon University 
The existence of Carnegie Mellon University began with Andrew Carnegie. A self-educated "working boy" who loved books, Andrew Carnegie emigrated from Scotland in 1848 and settled in Pittsburgh, Pa. Attending night school and borrowing books, Carnegie went from a factory worker in a textile mill to successful entrepreneur and industrialist. He rose to prominence by founding what became the world's largest steel-producing company by the end of the 19th century. At one point the richest man in the world, Carnegie believed that "to die rich is to die disgraced." He turned his attention to writing, social activism, and philanthropy, determined to establish educational opportunities for the general public where few existed.

In 1967, Carnegie Tech merged with the Mellon Institute, a science research center founded by the Mellon family of Pittsburgh, to become known as Carnegie Mellon University. The merger built upon a long history of support from the Mellons.

History of Carnegie Mellon University Africa 
In 2011, Carnegie Mellon University and the Government of Rwanda signed an agreement to establish a new Carnegie Mellon location in Kigali, Rwanda. This partnership was designed to respond to the critical shortage of high-quality engineering talent required to harness Africa’s potential as home to the fastest-growing workforce in the world.

CMU-Africa, located in Kigali Innovation City, is a regional ICT center of excellence.

On September 8, 2022, the Mastercard Foundation announced a $275.7 million donation to CMU, with $175 million going to CMU Africa's endowment and $100.7 million going to grow and establish technological universities throughout Africa.

Academics and Rankings 
CMU-Africa offers master's degrees in Information Technology, Electrical and Computer Engineering, and Engineering Artificial Intelligence. CMU-Africa currently has over 290 students and 400 alumni from 21 different nationalities.

CMU-Africa is part of the Carnegie Mellon College of Engineering. The College of Engineering is top-ranked among its peers. In U.S. News & World Reports 2023 graduate rankings, the College of Engineering was ranked #4.

Research 

CMU-Africa faculty, students, and alumni are actively engaged in projects that respond to the challenges and opportunities of the digital transformation of Africa. These projects have resulted in published journal and conference papers, raising the profile of Rwanda as a country where academic research is being pursued.

Location 
CMU-Africa is the first center of excellence to be located in Kigali Innovation City, whose goal is to drive Rwanda’s economic growth through digital transformation. The Kigali Innovation City is home to large corporations and technology companies making CMU-Africa's location strategic as it provides students the opportunity to interact directly with the industries around them.

References

External links 

 CMU-Africa website
 Carnegie Mellon University's College of Engineering
 Carnegie Mellon's global locations

Carnegie Mellon University
Educational institutions established in 2011
Universities and colleges in Rwanda
2011 establishments in Rwanda